Kiara Johnson also known by her stage name Katie Got Bandz (born July 22, 1993) is an American rapper from Chicago, Illinois, most recognized for her song "Pop Out" featuring King L.

Early life
Katie is from Bronzeville, a neighborhood in the Low End area of South Side, Chicago. Katie cites her neighborhood as the muse for her lyrics and the stories she tells while rapping. Her favorite rappers were Waka Flocka Flame, Nicki Minaj,   Drake, and Lil Wayne. Prior to rapping, she studied biology and pre-med at Truman College.

Musical career
Katie is the debut female rapper of Chicago's drill music scene, though she has announced plans to transition her music to a more global sound.  In several interviews she spoke of the poor reputation Chicago has with respect to crime and violence and the attack of drill music as a result. Katie has said that her intention with drill music is to portray her authentic experience and emphasizes she does not want to influence crime or contribute to the already high crime rate in Chicago through her music.

Her last project Drillary Clinton 3 was released on December 23, 2015, and she intended to transition her sound with this project while paying homage to drill music at the same time. After a three-year hiatus, she returned with the single "Work It Girl", released on May 10, 2018. She stated that she felt "refreshed" and was ready to let her fans "discover a different side" of her. She released her first mixtape in four years, Rebirth, in July 2019. In 2022, she had a verse on Nicki Minaj's 'Super Freaky Girl: Queen Mix', which was highly popular and sampled from Rick James' 'Super Freak.'

Discography

Mixtapes
 2012: Bandz and Hittaz
 2013: Drillary Clinton
 2014: Drillary Clinton 2
 2014: Coolin in Chiraq
 2015: Zero to 39th 
 2015: Drillary Clinton 3
 2019: Rebirth
 2022: Drillary Clinton 4

References

Underground rappers
Living people
African-American songwriters
American women rappers
African-American women rappers
American hip hop singers
Midwest hip hop musicians
Rappers from Chicago
Songwriters from Illinois
Drill musicians
1993 births
21st-century American rappers
21st-century American women musicians
21st-century African-American women
21st-century African-American musicians
21st-century women rappers